John von Ahlen (born 26 September 1968) is an Australian  musician, producer, vocalist, and instrumentalist based in Melbourne. He is the lead vocalist of the electronic pop and synthwave band Parralox, formed in 2008. Parralox caught the attention of the international EDM community within the same year. He has been additionally involved in other music projects, such as The Sound of the Crowd. and  The Tenth Stage. Von Ahlen also hosts Neon Nights on Joy 94.9, Australia's largest LGBTIQ radio station. He is also an animal rights activist.

Early life 
John von Ahlen is based in Melbourne, Australia and he was born on 26 September 1968. As a child, he explored music, taking up both the saxophone and clarinet; by high school his focus had switched to piano and synthesisers.

Career

Early music career 
His first band, Nova, was signed to Sirius Music records via Sony Dancepool Australia in 1993. John signed to a publishing deal with Mushroom Records after co-writing tracks with Gina G for the album "BC Nation" by Australian pop act "Bass Culture".
The track "Love Will Find A Way" from "BC Nation" was subsequently used in the Australian TV Soap Opera "Home and Away".

Film, television, and music videos 
In 2000, John von Ahlen co-wrote and produced the song Get Tzatziki With It for the 2000 Australian comedy film The Wog Boy (starring Australian actor Nick Giannopoulos). He also contributed to other motion picture soundtracks including Happy Endings Sleepover, Mangus!, and Fat Girls.

In 2003, John von Ahlen produced the theme music for the Australian light entertainment television programme Rove Live, and he additionally composed and produced the theme music for the television comedy programs Skithouse and Before the Game.

John von Ahlen has directed and produced numerous music videos, with over 3 million views for his work with Parralox. In 1997, producer John Von Ahlen of Subterrane Recording Studio created an unofficial video for The Human League single "Stay With Me Tonight" that was distributed on the internet. The von Ahlen video utilized animated stills using 3dfx and Version 4.2 of Adobe Premiere. It has now become the de facto music video for the track.

Collaborations 
While managed by Jaime Jimenez, John von Ahlen formed the production company "Planet J" and produced, remixed and co-wrote on many projects including the 2000 Australian comedy film The Wog Boy and collaborating with artists Emmanuel Carella, Chrissa, Jimmy Christo, X3, and Girl Friday.

John von Ahlen also collaborated with Ean Sugarman (of the Australian pop act Euphoria) and they produced and remixed for artists including Lani Zaitman, Melissa James and Dara.

John von Ahlen produced the track Somebody (Is Out There) for Paul Lekakis, known for his 80s hit Boom Boom (Let's Go Back to My Room).

John von Ahlen and Jiminez also formed the short lived dance project "Mr Jones" which was signed to Sony Music Australia, and released the single "Better Days" in 2002, and the "Big Adventure" in 2003 which featured Belinda Emmett on lead vocals.

John von Ahlen has also contributed vocals to the English synth project Sound of Science, as well as the Australian electronic music label Clan Analogue.

In 2018 John von Ahlen produced the single "Fly Me To The Moon" for the Australian trans-human performer "Venus Virgin Tomarz", released on his label Subterrane Records.

Parralox 
Despite his successful career producing music for other artists, he felt the need to make music for himself – leading him to form the dark and gothic steampunk band The Tenth Stage. He soon started venturing more towards pop music. In 2008, he created the electronic pop and synthwave band Parralox, which has performed internationally and had international chart success on the U.S. Billboard Hot Dance/Club Charts, the UK Upfront Club Chart Top 40 and the Official UK Music Week Commercial Pop Top 30. Notable contributors to Parralox include Jane Badler, Marcella Detroit, and Ian Burden (The Human League). Influences on Paralox include  Stuart Price, Trevor Horn, and Goldfrapp.

Neon Nights 
John von Ahlen is the host of Neon Nights on Joy 94.9, Australia's largest LGBTIQ radio station. He has interviewed numerous artists on Neon Nights including Dannii Minogue, Róisín Murphy, Tina Arena, Stonebridge, CeCe Peniston, Bright Light Bright Light, Sheena Easton, The Pointer Sisters,Kim Wilde, Limahl, Vince Clarke of Erasure, Midge Ure of Ultravox, Peter Hook of New Order, Mi-Sex, The Dandy Warhols, Martika, Paul Lekakis, Crystal Waters,  Whigfield, Marcella Detroit, Marcia Hines, Howard Jones, Tina Cousins,Corona, Culture Beat, and Billie Ray Martin.

Discography

Parralox 

 Electricity (2008)
 State of Decay (2009)
 Metropolis (2010)
 Metropolism (2011)
 Recovery (2013)
 Electricity (Expanded) (2014)
 Aeronaut (2015)
 Subculture (2016)
 Genesis (2019)
 Travelogue (2021)

The Tenth Stage 

 The Tenth Stage (2006)
 Tales from the Casket (2008)
 Grand Guignol (2008)

Songwriting and production

External links

References 

Living people
Australian male singer-songwriters
Australian singer-songwriters
21st-century Australian singers
21st-century Australian male singers
1968 births